Gália is a municipality in the state of São Paulo in Brazil. The population is 6,482 (2020 est.) in an area of 356 km². The elevation is 561 m.

The municipality contains 80% of the  Caetetus Ecological Station, created in 1976.

References

Municipalities in São Paulo (state)